The 2021–22 UEFA Women's Champions League group stage, which is first ever group stage of the competition, began on 5 October 2021 and ended on 16 December 2021. A total of 16 teams will compete in the group stage to decide the 8 places in the knockout phase of the 2021–22 UEFA Women's Champions League.

Køge, 1899 Hoffenheim and  Real Madrid were playing in Europe for the first time this season. Benfica, Juventus, Zhytlobud-1 Kharkiv and Servette Chênois made their debut appearance in the last 16 under any format. Benfica were the first team from Portugal to in the last 16.

Draw
The draw for the group stage was held on 13 September 2021, 13:00 CEST, in Nyon. The 16 teams were drawn into four groups of four. For the draw, the teams were seeded into four pots, each of four teams, based on the following principles:
Pot 1 contained the four direct entrants, i.e., the Champions League holders and the champions of the top three associations based on their 2020 UEFA women's country coefficients.
Pot 2, 3 and 4 contained the remaining teams, seeded based on their 2021 UEFA women's club coefficients.
Teams from the same association could not be drawn into the same group. Prior to the draw, UEFA formed one pairing of teams for associations with two or three teams based on television audiences, where one team was drawn into Groups A–B and another team into Groups C–D, so that the two teams played on different days. Clubs from countries with severe winter conditions (Sweden, Iceland) were assigned a position in their group which allowed them to play away on matchday 6.

 A  Barcelona and  Real Madrid
 B  Paris Saint-Germain and Lyon
 C  Bayern Munich and VfL Wolfsburg
 D  Chelsea and Arsenal

Teams
Below are the participating teams (with their 2021 UEFA club coefficients), grouped by their seeding pot. They include:
4 teams which entered in this stage
12 winners of the Round 2 (7 from Champions Path, 5 from League Path)

Notes

Format
In each group, teams played against each other home-and-away in a round-robin format. The top two teams of each group advanced to the quarter-finals.

Tiebreakers
Teams are ranked according to points (3 points for a win, 1 point for a draw, 0 points for a loss). If two or more teams are tied on points, the following tiebreaking criteria are applied, in the order given, to determine the rankings (see Article 18 Equality of points – group stage, Regulations of the UEFA Women's Champions League):
Points in head-to-head matches among the tied teams;
Goal difference in head-to-head matches among the tied teams;
Goals scored in head-to-head matches among the tied teams;
If more than two teams were tied, and after applying all head-to-head criteria above, a subset of teams are still tied, all head-to-head criteria above are reapplied exclusively to this subset of teams;
Goal difference in all group matches;
Goals scored in all group matches;
Away goals scored in all group matches;
Wins in all group matches;
Away wins in all group matches;
Disciplinary points (direct red card = 3 points; double yellow card = 3 points; single yellow card = 1 point);
UEFA club coefficient.
Due to the abolition of the away goals rule, head-to-head away goals are no longer applied as a tiebreaker. However, total away goals are still applied as a tiebreaker.

Groups
The fixtures were announced on 13 September 2021 after the draw. The matches were played on 5–6 October, 13–14 October, 9–10 November, 17–18 November, 8–9 December, and 15–16 December 2021. The scheduled kick-off times were 18:45 and 21:00 CET/CEST, with two matches at both kick-off times on each day.

Times are CET/CEST, as listed by UEFA (local times, if different, are in parentheses).

Group A

Group B

Group C

Group D

Notes

References

External links

Fixtures and Results, 2021–22, UEFA.com

group stage
2021-22
October 2021 sports events in Europe
November 2021 sports events in Europe
December 2021 sports events in Europe